The RABDe 12/12 is a threepart electric multiple unit used for commuter traffic by the Swiss Federal Railways SBB-CFF-FFS. The trains were put into service in the late 1960s and were in S-Bahn service around Zurich until December 2008.

Introduction

For the introduction of more frequent service (every half an hour) on the "Golden Coast Line" ("Goldküstenlinie") Zürich–Meilen–Rapperswil, 20 electric multiple units RABDe 12/12 were put into service in 1967 to be able to maintain the tight schedule with the frequent stops. They consist of two second class end cars and a first class car with mail compartment in between. They originally had a claret livery, which was an exception at that time (most other SBB-CFF-FFS vehicles had the same green livery). They got the nickname "Golden Coast Express" ("Goldküstenexpress"), due to their service on the Golden Coast (which is the northern waterside of the lake of Zurich, known for its high land prices, thus attracting mainly wealthy levels of the population). With the introduction of the new double-decker S-Bahn trains in the 1990s, they lost their prestigious role and were subsequently used on lines with low passenger frequencies. The trains, which were all modernized in the 1990s, remained in S-Bahn service until December 2008. The last trainset has been scrapped in 2010.

Operation
The trainsets are equipped with automatic +GF+ couplers, allowing for economic operation. The three cars of a trainset are short-coupled and cannot be separated in regular service. Due to the low capacity of a single trainset, they are often used in pairs nowadays (an exception is the S24 service); up to four trainsets can be coupled together and be driven using multiple unit train control.

Technology
The trains use conventional transformer technology with fixed running notches, which can be felt by the passengers while the train is accelerating, and are equipped with regenerative brakes. They feature an automatic speed control system, which allows the engineer to simply select the desired speed while the train chooses the running notches automatically, accelerating, decelerating or maintaining speed as desired.

Accidents / Changes in designation / Revisions
Of the original 20 trainsets, four of them were badly damaged in two accidents in 1971. Trainsets 1119 and 1109 collided at Herrliberg, 1117 and 1113 at Uetikon. Both collisions damaged two end cars and one middle car each, which had to be scrapped. Four "new" units were built from the parts still intact and two uninvolved trainsets 1106 and 1111, resulting in the trainsets 1109II and 1113II, while trainset 1120 was renumbered to 1117II.

All 18 remaining trainsets (1101–1118) were rebuilt after 30 years of service in the course of a total revision (R4). They were renumbered according to the new Swiss numbering scheme to RABDE 510 000- 510 017, got a new livery in NPZ-colors and automatic doors.

Curios
The inconspicuous post in the middle of the entrance platforms of the two end-cars is not primarily a handle for passengers, but it leads the 15 kV traction current from the roof to the high voltage systems below the passenger compartment. Another noticeable fact is that all axles are driven, which is very unusual for commuter trains used by the SBB-CFF-FFS. Together with the high power these trains have at their disposal, they are able to accelerate very quickly, which led to another known nickname, "Mirage" (coming from the name of a fighter jet Dassault Mirage, bought by the Swiss Armed Forces at about the same time).

See also

 List of stock used by Swiss Federal Railways

Sources
This article was mostly translated from the German language version of July 2006.

Brown, Boveri & Cie multiple units
Multiple units of Switzerland